The New Flyer Low Floor was a line of low-floor transit buses available in 30-foot rigid, 35-foot rigid, 40-foot rigid, and 60-foot articulated lengths manufactured by New Flyer Industries between 1991 and 2014. In addition to the different available lengths, the buses were sold with a variety of prime movers, ranging from conventional diesel and CNG combustion engines to diesel-electric hybrid, gasoline hybrid, and hydrogen fuel cell.  The New Flyer Low Floor was restyled in 2005, resulting in two distinct variants: the Low Floor Restyled (LFR), which largely replaced the conventional Low Floor for transit service, and the Low Floor Advanced (LFA), which was intended for bus rapid transit service. New Flyer introduced the Invero in 1999 with the intent that it would replace the Low Floor line, but few were sold; in 2008, New Flyer introduced the Xcelsior, and the Low Floor line was discontinued by 2014.

Design

For example, a New Flyer DE40LFR is a 40-foot (nominal) rigid Low Floor (Restyled) with diesel-electric hybrid power. Not all combinations of models, lengths, and powertrains were made.

The New Flyer Low Floor is based on the Den Oudsten B85/B86, a bus design initially introduced in 1984 by the Dutch company Den Oudsten. Den Oudsten purchased Flyer Industries in 1986, and the newly renamed New Flyer introduced the High Floor series with the D40HF in 1987. A B85 was sent to the United States for testing in 1988, and New Flyer subsequently developed and launched the Low Floor series with the D40LF, which began production in 1991 at the Grand Forks assembly plant.

The first low-floor articulated buses (D60LF) were introduced by New Flyer in 1995. Other milestones include the first natural gas-powered buses (C/L40LF, 1994), the first hydrogen fuel cell buses (F40LF, 1994), the first diesel-electric hybrid buses (DE40LF, 1998), the first gasoline-electric hybrid buses (GE40LF, 2002), and the first hydrogen-electric hybrid bus (HE40LF, 2004). One prototype Low Floor trolleybus was introduced in 2005, sold to Coast Mountain Bus Company as an E40LF model; since New Flyer were introducing their Low Floor Restyled series that year, production of Low Floor trolleybuses has been designated as E40LFR and E60LFR.

Hybrid powertrains
The series hybrid powertrain is supplied by ISE Corporation, branded ThunderVolt. The ISE ThunderVolt system is modular, with several primary subsystems including a diesel, gasoline, or hydrogen-fueled auxiliary power unit (APU), traction motors and gearbox (supplied by Siemens under the ELFA brand), and energy storage (using either batteries or ultracapacitors).

Gasoline
Emissions regulations developed by the South Coast Air Quality Management District prevented local transit agencies in southern California from purchasing new diesel-powered transit buses after 2002. Although most agencies responded by pursuing natural gas-powered buses, Long Beach Transit (LBT) conducted a cost analysis that concluded a gasoline-electric hybrid could meet emissions requirements and also be cost-effective. LBT went on to purchase 47 model year 2004 and 2005 GE40LF buses, the first major purchase of the GE40LF.

The electricity generated by the APU is stored in two banks of 144 ultracapacitors each. The Siemens ELFA traction motors and combining gearbox are the same in all ThunderVolt implementations.

Hydrogen
ISE also built the ThunderVolt TB40-HICE, a prototype 40-foot hydrogen-electric hybrid Low Floor. This prototype, designated HE40LF, was equipped with the ISE ThunderVolt series hybrid powertrain, using a Ford 6.8L V10 internal combustion engine modified to run on hydrogen, which was in turn coupled to a generator to provide energy for the traction motor and storage battery. It was tested by SunLine Transit Agency (who assigned it fleet number 550) and Winnipeg Transit in early 2005 in revenue service. The derelict HE40LF was displayed by Ken Porter Auctions in early 2020 and presumably sold for scrap.

Deployment 

The first New Flyer Low Floor buses were delivered to the Port Authority of New York and New Jersey in 1992. The first articulated Low Floor (D60LF), an ex-demo unit, was sold to Strathcona County Transit in Alberta in 1996. That bus, which Strathcona designated 950, was retired and sold at auction in 2009 or 2010.

Omnitrans, serving the city of San Bernardino, was the lead agency for the ISE ThunderVolt gasoline-electric hybrid powertrain deployed in the GE40LF. Omnitrans procured two of the three testing prototypes; Long Beach Transit placed the first large-volume regular production order.

Coast Mountain Bus Company designated their E40LF as TransLink 2101, which was unveiled at Stanley Park in 2005. Although it is designated an E40LF, 2101 bears the updated front and rear fascias of the LFR "Restyled" models.

H40LFR fuel cell vehicles
Twenty-one examples of the fuel cell "restyled" variant designated H40LFR were operated by SunLine Transit Agency and BC Transit. 20 H40LFR buses were built for BC Transit in 2010 at an estimated total cost of  million, including operating costs through 2014. They were meant to showcase fuel cell vehicles during the 2010 Winter Olympics. After 2014, BC Transit announced plans to sell off their H40LFR buses, stating that operating costs were double that of conventional diesel-powered buses.

Competition
 Gillig Low Floor
 NABI LFW
NABI BRT
 Neoplan AN440LF and AN460LF
 Nova Bus LFS and LFSA
 OBI Orion VI
 OBI Orion VII

References

External links
 

Buses of Canada
Buses of the United States
Low Floor
Vehicles introduced in 1991
Fuel cell buses
Articulated buses
Low-floor buses